Nylon Angel is a postcyberpunk novel by science fiction author Marianne de Pierres

Plot summary
The story is set in post-apocalyptic Australia, around a city called the Tert. There, a bounty hunter/bodyguard named Parrish Plessis has ended up working for a ganglord called Jamon Mondo. She wants out, and her answer arrives in the form of two men wanted in connection with the killing of a journalist called Razz Retribution (In this world, the army, churches and the government have given up on the world, so it is now ruled by the media).

The story is divided between the Tert, a rundown slum reminiscent of Mega-City One, and Viva City (a pun on the word vivacity), a walled suburb some forty kilometres up the coast.

Adaptations
A role playing game based on the series has been created by White Mice Worldbuilding.

Notes

2004 novels
2004 science fiction novels
Australian science fiction novels
Postcyberpunk novels
Novels set in Australia
Orbit Books books